Netra (Norddeutsche Erdgas Transversale) is a  long natural gas pipeline system in Germany, which runs from the Dornum natural gas receiving facilitiy at the coast of North Sea to Salzwedel in eastern Germany, where it is connected with the JAGAL pipeline. The pipeline is extended to Berlin through the Salzwedel–Berlin connection.

Construction of the Netra pipeline was agreed in 1994 and the pipeline was commissioned in 1995. Originally it run from the Etzel gas storage facility to Salzwedel.  In 1999, after commissioning the Europipe II pipeline, the NETRA pipeline system is extended from Etzel to Dornum.  The compressor station near Wardenburg was built in 2003.

The pipeline was owned and operated by NETRA GmbH Norddeutsche Erdgas Transversale & Co KG, a joint venture of E.ON Ruhrgas (41.7%), Gasunie Deutschland (29.6%) and Statoil (28.7%). Now it is owned and operated by Open Grid Europe.

See also

 Europipe I
 Europipe II

References

Buildings and structures completed in 1995
Natural gas pipelines in Germany